The 1971 Bromsgrove by-election was a parliamentary by-election held in the United Kingdom on 27 May 1971 for the Bromsgrove constituency in Worcestershire. The vacancy was caused by the death of Conservative Member of Parliament (MP) James Dance. The seat was won by the opposition Labour Party in a by-election that saw only the two major parties participating.

Results

References

Bromsgrove by-election
Bromsgrove by-election
Bromsgrove by-election
By-elections to the Parliament of the United Kingdom in Worcestershire constituencies
Bromsgrove